The Mortgages and Home Finance: Conduct of Business Sourcebook (MCOB) governs the relationship between mortgage lenders and borrowers in the United Kingdom. They were issued in October 2003 by The Financial Services Authority. They apply to Regulated Mortgage Contracts which are entered into on or after 31 October 2004.The Financial Services Authority became the Financial Conduct Authority in April 2013.

Task 
The task of the Mortgage Conduct of Business is consumer protection, industry stability, and healthy competition between financial service providers.

Definitions 

A 'Regulated Mortgage Contract' is a loan on the security of a first legal mortgage on land in the United Kingdom of which at least 40% is used as or in connection with a dwelling by the borrower. This loan can be to an individual or a trustee.

A credit agreement secured on land that is not a regulated mortgage contract, for example because the borrower is not an individual or
a trustee, may be a regulated credit agreement to which the CCA and CONC apply.

The MCOB rules were designed to improve the information available to consumers and increase consumers' ability to make informed choices in the mortgage market.

Regulations 

They are a broad scheme of regulations covering:

 Mortgage selling
 Communication
 Financial promotion
 Conduct of advising and selling
 Disclosure of information
 Terms of offer documents
 Duty to treat customers fairly
 Duty to keep records
 Equity release schemes
 Arrears and repossessions
 Calculation of the annual percentage rate
 Calculation of total charge for credit
 Charges

The MCOB rules apply to every firm that carries on a home finance activity. A 'firm' may be a mortgage lender, administrator, arranger or adviser. A 'home finance activity' may be a regulated mortgage contract, a home purchase plan or a home reversion plan.

Weblink

References 

Mortgage industry of the United Kingdom